Madison County is a county located in the north central portion of the state of Florida, and borders the state of Georgia to the north. As of the 2020 census, the population was 17,968. Its county seat is also called Madison.

History
Located in what is known as the Florida Panhandle, Madison County was created in 1827. It was named for James Madison, fourth President of the United States of America, who served from 1809 to 1817. It was developed as part of the plantation belt, with cotton cultivated and processed by enslaved African Americans.

In the period after Reconstruction, racial violence rose in the state, reaching a peak at the end of the 19th century and extending into the difficult economic years of the 1920s and 1930s. According to the Equal Justice Institute's 2015 report, Lynching in America: Confronting Racial Terror, from 1877 to 1950, Madison County had 16 lynchings in this period, the 6th highest of any county in the state. The county's economic and population growth was stagnant from the 1880s and for several decades into the early 20th century.

In 1945, the county's population of 15,537 was divided evenly between black and white. The last known lynching in the county was that in October 1945 of Jesse James Payne, a young married sharecropper with a child. After an economic dispute with the white landowner where he was sharecropping, where Payne escaped murder following "a demand for an unjust debt repayment", he was charged with sexually assaulting the landowner's daughter, but was innocent. The sheriff and other law enforcement officials appeared implicated in Payne's murder, as he was left in the county jail unguarded after mob action had been threatened. Payne's was the only recorded lynching nationwide that year, when World War II ended. The case received national attention and the governor was strongly criticized for failure to mount a true investigation or to take action against the sheriff.
As of August, 2012, Madison became a wet county, meaning that voters had approved the legal sale, possession, or distribution of alcoholic beverages.

Geography

Adjacent counties
 Brooks County, Georgia - north
 Lowndes County, Georgia - northeast
 Hamilton County - east
 Suwannee County - southeast
 Lafayette County - southeast
 Taylor County - southwest
 Jefferson County - west

Demographics

2020 census
Note: the US Census treats Hispanic/Latino as an ethnic category. This table excludes Latinos from the racial categories and assigns them to a separate category. Hispanics/Latinos can be of any race.

As of the 2020 United States census, there were 17,968 people, 6,778 households, and 4,232 families residing in the county.

2000 census
As of the census of 2000, there were 18,733 people, 6,629 households, and 4,680 families residing in the county. The population density was 27 people per square mile (10/km2). There were 7,836 housing units at an average density of 11 per square mile (4/km2). The racial makeup of the county was 57.49% Caucasian, 40.30% Black or African American, 0.32% Native American, 0.32% Asian, 0.02% Pacific Islander, 0.51% from other races, and 1.04% from two or more races. 3.20% of the population were Hispanic or Latino of any race.

There were 6,629 households, out of which 31.90% had children under the age of 18 living with them, 48.90% were married couples living together, 17.50% had a female householder with no husband present, and 29.40% were non-families. 25.40% of all households were made up of individuals, and 11.60% had someone living alone who was 65 years of age or older. The average household size was 2.57 and the average family size was 3.06.

In the county, the population was spread out, with 25.30% under the age of 18, 9.20% from 18 to 24, 28.20% from 25 to 44, 22.70% from 45 to 64, and 14.60% who were 65 years of age or older. The median age was 36 years. For every 100 females there were 107.60 males. For every 100 females age 18 and over, there were 106.80 males.

The median income for a household in the county was $26,533, and the median income for a family was $31,753. Males had a median income of $25,255 versus $19,607 for females. The per capita income for the county was $12,511. About 18.90% of families and 23.10% of the population were below the poverty line, including 30.10% of those under age 18 and 22.50% of those age 65 or over.

Transportation

Major highways

  Interstate 10 is the main interstate highway through Madison County, running west and east through the panhandle from Alabama to Jacksonville. Four interchanges exist in the county at US 221 south of Greenville, (Exit 241), SR 14 (Exit 251) and SR 53 (Exit 258) south of Madison, and CR 255 south of Lee (Exit 262).
   US 19/27 is a multiplexed pair of south-to-north US highways that briefly runs through the southwestern corner of the county known as the Florida-Georgia Parkway.
  US 90 was the main west-to-east route through Madison County until it was supplanted by I-10.
  US 221 is the main south-to-north US highway in western Madison County.
  State Road 6 runs northeast from US 90 into Jasper in Hamilton County east of Madison.
  State Road 14 is a short state road from I-10 to US 90 in Madison, with a western county extension in Taylor and Madison Counties, and a truck route to SR 53 (see below)
  State Road 53
  State Road 145

Railroads
Madison County has at least two railroad lines. The primary one is a CSX line formerly owned by the Seaboard Air Line Railroad; it served Amtrak's Sunset Limited until it was truncated to New Orleans in 2005 by Hurricane Katrina. The station was Madison County's only active passenger railroad station until that point. The other line is owned by the Georgia and Florida Railway, and runs in close proximity to US 221 throughout Madison County.

Education

Madison County Schools operates public schools. Madison County High School is one of the two high schools in Madison, the other is a charter high school, James Madison Preparatory High School.

Libraries
Madison County is served by the Suwannee River Regional Library System, which contains eight branches and also serves Hamilton and Suwannee counties.
 Branford
 Greenville
 Jasper
 Jennings
 Lee
 Live Oak
 Madison
 White Springs

Communities

City
 Madison

Towns
 Greenville
 Lee

Unincorporated communities

 Cherry Lake
 Hamburg
 Hanson
 Hopewell
 Lamont
 Lovett
 Pinetta
 Sirmans

Politics

Notable residents
The small town of Greenville was the childhood home of rhythm and blues giant Ray Charles. Professional football player Chris Thompson is also from the Town of Greenville. Professional baseball player Lorenzo Cain is from Madison County. Scott Phillips, drummer for the bands Creed and Alter Bridge is also from Madison.

See also
 National Register of Historic Places listings in Madison County, Florida

References

External links

Government links/Constitutional offices
 Madison County Board of County Commissioners
 Madison County Supervisor of Elections
 Madison County Property Appraiser
 Madison County Sheriff's Office
 Madison County Tax Collector

Special districts
 Madison County Schools
 Suwannee River Water Management District

Judicial branch
 Madison County Clerk of Courts
 Public Defender, 3rd Judicial Circuit of Florida serving Columbia, Dixie, Hamilton, Lafayette, Madison, Suwannee, and Taylor Counties
 Office of the State Attorney, 3rd Judicial Circuit of Florida
 Circuit and County Court for the 3rd Judicial Circuit of Florida

Tourism links
 Madison County Chamber of Commerce

Miscellaneous links
 Madison Collection Approximately 1,000 photographs of Madison County-area people, industries, and agriculture. From the State Library & Archives of Florida.
 North Florida Community College , Madison, Florida
 Senior Citizens Council of Madison County, Florida
 The New Enterprise, Online historical newspaper
 Madison Enterprise-Recorder, newspaper
 Madison County Carrier newspaper
 Artz, a community portal for the artists and writers of Madison County.

 
Florida counties
1827 establishments in Florida Territory
Populated places established in 1827
North Florida